The Storhamar Dragons are a Norwegian ice hockey club based in Hamar. They are members of the highest Norwegian ice hockey league, Eliteserien (known as GET-ligaen for sponsorship reasons). Their home arena has been Hamar OL-Amfi since 1992. Ice hockey in Hamar was first played in 1955 by boys who had been inspired by the 1952 Winter Olympics in Oslo. This became the basis of Storhamar Ishockey, which was founded in 1957 as a department of the sports club Storhamar IL. Since 1998, they have been marketing themselves as the Storhamar Dragons. As of 2010, they have completed thirty seasons in the Eliteserien, winning 670 regular season games and seven league titles.

Storhamar qualified for the 2. divisjon (second tier) in 1962 as the first team outside Oslo, and were promoted to the highest division, 1. divisjon (Eliteserien from 1990 onwards), for the first time in 1977. During the 1990s, the Dragons established themselves as one of the leadings teams in Norway, winning their first Norwegian Championship title in 1995. Between the 1993–94 season and 1999–2000 season, they contested all seven Finals, winning four times. After losing out in the Semi-finals in 2001, the Dragons have reached another five Finals, winning twice.

Seasons

Notes
Code explanation; GP—Games Played, W—Wins, L—Losses, T—Tied games, OTW—Overtime/Shootout wins, OTL—Overtime/Shootout losses, GF—Goals For, GA—Goals Against, Pts—Points
Before the 1961–62 season, the club were moved down to the 3. divisjon (fourth tier) due to a re-organization of the league system.
The result of the eighth game is unknown.
Storhamar tied first with Grüner and won the two-legged replay for the Division Championship (2–2, 11–4).
The results of the sixth and seventh game are unknown.
Before the 1963–64 season, the top division, Hovedserien was renamed 1. divisjon. Correspondingly, the 1. divisjon (second tier)  was renamed 2. divisjon, the 2. divisjon (third tier) was renamed 3. divisjon etc.
The result of the twelfth game is unknown.
Before the 1970–71 season, the Dragons re-qualified for the 2. divisjon after defeating Eiksmarka 7–3 during the pre-season.
The result of the tenth game is unknown.
Storhamar declined to participate in qualifying for the 1. divisjon due to the ongoing construction of Storhamar Ishall.
Mellomspillet was a one-time continuation league contested in 1984–85 between the six highest ranked teams in the 1. divisjon. Of these six teams, the top four qualified for the semi-finals of the Norwegian Championship.
Before the 1990–91 season, the 1. divisjon was renamed Eliteserien. Correspondingly, the 2. divisjon (second tier) was renamed 1. divisjon, the 3. divisjon (third tier) was renamed 2. divisjon etc.
Between the 1990–91 season and the 1993–94 season, the Eliteserien was divided into two parts. After the first 18 games, the top eight teams qualified for the second half of the Eliteserien. In 1990–91, the results of both rounds were added up to produce one regular season champion; in the three following seasons, there were two champions per season.
As of the 2002–03 season, all games have a winner. In addition, teams now receive three points for a win in regulation time, two points for a win in overtime and one point for a loss in overtime.
Storhamar were deducted five points for use of an ineligible player during three games in November 2009.
Totals as of the completion of the 2009–10 season.

References

Storhamar Dragons seasons, List of
Storhamar Ishockey